A seed crystal is a small piece of single crystal or polycrystal material from which a large crystal of typically the same material is grown in a laboratory. Used to replicate material, the use of seed crystal to promote growth avoids the otherwise slow randomness of natural crystal growth and allows manufacture on a scale suitable for industry.

Crystal enlargement
The large crystal can be grown by dipping the seed into a supersaturated solution, into molten material that is then cooled, or by growth on the seed face by passing vapor of the material to be grown over it.

Theory
The theory behind this effect is thought to derive from the physical intermolecular interaction that occurs between compounds in a supersaturated solution (or possibly vapor). In solution, liberated (soluble) molecules (solute) are free to move about in random flow. This random flow permits for the possibility of two or more molecular compounds to interact. This interaction can potentiate intermolecular forces between the separate molecules and form a basis for a crystal lattice. The placement of a seed crystal into solution allows the recrystallization process to expedite by eliminating the need for random molecular collision or interaction. By introducing an already pre-formed basis of the target crystal to act upon, the intermolecular interactions are formed much more easily or readily, than relying on random flow. Often, this phase transition from solute in a solution to a crystal lattice will be referred to as nucleation. Seeding is therefore said to decrease the necessary amount of time needed for nucleation to occur in a recrystallization process.

Uses
One example where a seed crystal is used to grow large boules or ingots of a single crystal is the semiconductor industry where methods such as the Czochralski process or Bridgman technique are employed.

Also during the process of tempering chocolate, seed crystals can be used to promote the growth of favorable type V crystals

See also
 Crystal structure
 Crystallization
 Laser heated pedestal growth
 Micro-pulling-down
 Polycrystal
 Single crystal
 Wafer (electronics)
 Disappearing polymorphs

References

Crystals